Dagoudane Arrondissement is an arrondissement of the Pikine Department in the Dakar Region of Senegal.

It is divided into 7 communes d'arrondissment: Dalifort, Djida Thiaroye Kao, Guinaw Rail Nord, Guinaw Rail Sud, Pikine Est, Pikine Ouest and Pikine Sud.

References

Arrondissements of Senegal
Dakar Region